Ilarion Roganović (12 July 1828 – 15 January 1882) was the Metropolitan of Montenegro and the Highlands from 1860 to 1882. Earlier, he was also the archimandrite of the Ždrebaonik, Ostrog and Cetinje Monasteries. He is remembered as the founder of the Committee of the Red Cross of Montenegro.

Biography

Early life
Ilarion was born Ilija Roganović on 12 July 1828 in Podgorica to Đuro and Marija Roganović (née Marković). His family was poor, and he was taught by a local priest, Aleksije Radičević, and hieromonk Isaija Bajković who ordained him as a monk at Vranjina Monastery.

Service in the church
Metropolitan Petar II ordained him as a hierodeacon in 1843 and then as a hieromonk in 1847. After the death of Isaija Bajković, Ilarion became the abbot of Ždrebaonik Monastery near Danilovgrad. In 1856, he was called to Cetinje to study there, after which he became the abbot of Ostrog Monastery. From Ostrog, he moved to Cetinje Monastery where he became archimandrite, meaning he was de facto named successor to the Metropolitan.

On 5 August 1860, Prince Nikola named him the Metropolitan of Montenegro and the Highlands. On 14 October 1862, he requested Ilarion be consecrated in Russia, and his request was confirmed on 19 January 1863. Ilarion was consecrated on 23 May 1863 at the Alexander Nevsky Lavra in Saint Petersburg.

Death
He died on 15 January 1882, and was buried in the Vlah Church in Cetinje. He was succeeded by Visarion Ljubiša.

Reforms

In 1864, Ilarion introduced an order that reformed the parishes and introduced archpriests. In 1866, parishes were reformed again making them more equal in population. After this, 60 priests were left without parishes, but were paid a yearly sum from parishes with more than 120 houses. Under Ilarion, an inventory of all monastery lands was created in 1868. 

In 1866, Roganović ordered that all priests must grow their beards. They were, however, allowed to wear their national costume. Ilarion also introduced registers of births, deaths and marriages, expanding the earlier practice of recording only baptisms, started by Peter I.

Under Ilarion, the new Eparchy of Raška and Zahumlje was created. It covered the areas conquered by Montenegro in the Montenegrin–Ottoman War of 1878 and was led by Visarion Ljubiša, who Ilarion and the Bishop of the Bay of Kotor Gerasim Petranović consecrated on 8 September 1878.

In 1869, the Cetinje Seminary was officially opened. During his service, Ilarion consecrated 45 temples and ordained 119 priests.

In 1875, Ilarion became the first president of the Red Cross of Montenegro.

References

1828 births
1882 deaths
19th-century Eastern Orthodox bishops
19th-century Montenegrin people
Archimandrites
Bishops of Montenegro and the Littoral
People from Podgorica
People of the Principality of Montenegro